Estonia competed at the 2005 World Championships in Athletics.

Medalists

World Championships in Athletics
2005